This is a list of marathoners who are athletes notable for their achievements in the marathon. For a list of people notable in other fields who have also run marathons, see List of marathoners who are non-running specialists.

Legend

Men

Women

References

Marathon running
Marathoners